William Frank Gilly is an American biologist specializing in the study of cephalopods. He works at Gilly Lab, Hopkins Marine Station, in Monterey County, as a professor of biology, at Stanford University and was involved with the television special The Future is Wild.

Early life
Gilly received a BSE (Electrical Engineering, 1972) from Princeton University and a Ph.D. (Physiology and Biophysics, 1978) from Washington University in St. Louis. He had additional training at Yale University, University of Pennsylvania and the Marine Biological Laboratory at Woods Hole.

Career
Over the last 30 years he has contributed to the basic understanding of electrical excitability in nerve and muscle cells in a wide range of organisms ranging from brittle-stars to mammals. Much of this work employed the giant axon system of the squid as an experimental model system for molecular and biophysical approaches. Additional physiological studies made in the living squid revealed unexpected complexities in how the giant axon system controls escape responses, and how mechanisms governing that control are subject to modification by environmental factors like temperature and during normal development.

Humboldt squid
Gilly's current research program on squid concentrates on the behavior and physiology of Dosidicus gigas, the jumbo or Humboldt squid. Fieldwork in the Gulf of California near Santa Rosalía, Baja California Sur and off Monterey Bay employs a variety of tagging methodologies in order to track short-term diel vertical migrations as well as long-distance migrations.

Recognition
Gilly was nominated by Stanford University to be one of the USA Science and Engineering Festival's Nifty Fifty Speakers who spoke about his work and career to middle and high school students in October 2010. He is also an adviser to the Microbes Mind Forum.

Personal life
Gilly is an avid fan of John Steinbeck, Ed Ricketts, Robinson Jeffers and other notable characters in the Monterey peninsula.

References

External links 

 Selected Publications (2003-present) at Gilly Lab
 William Gilly at Hopkins Marine Station
 Gilly Lab at Stanford University (2022-09-21)
 Gilly Lab at Stanford University (2016-05-28)
 Profile at National Geographic

21st-century American biologists
Living people
Princeton University School of Engineering and Applied Science alumni
Year of birth missing (living people)
Washington University in St. Louis alumni
Teuthologists
Stanford University faculty
Yale University alumni
University of Pennsylvania alumni